Wong Ka Wai may refer to:

 Kawai Wong (born Wong Ka Wai (黃家惠), Hong Kong magazine editor, writer and fashion stylist
 Wong Ka Wai (Tung Chung) (黃家圍) in Tung Chung, Lantau Island
 Wong Ka Wai (Tuen Mun) (皇家圍), in San Hui

See also
 Wong Kar-wai, film director